Jałowicze, (uk: Яловичі, pl: Jełowicze)  is a village in Volhynia, Western Ukraine in the Dubno Raion, Rivne Oblast. It lies
15 km south east of Lutsk, on the right bank of the Styr river.

History 
The village's origins were as a Ruthenian settlement within the Grand Duchy of Lithuania. Jełowicze together with the neighbouring hamlet of Bożeniec, belonged through the 14th and 15th-centuries to the Ruthenian Jełowicki family, whose name dates from the 14th-century and recalls their ownership of the domain. With the signing of the Union of Lublin in 1569, it became part of the  Lithuanian-Polish commonwealth. The village baroque church built in 1669, was founded by a Lutsk judge,  for the Dominican Order. Following the Partitions of the Polish Lithuanian Commonwealth, the territory was occupied by the Russian Empire and the religious oder was suppressed, turning the abbey church into a parish church. After World War I Jałowicze became part of the Second Republic of Poland. The Soviet invasion of Poland, led to its incorporation into the Soviet Union.

Notable features 
 Jałowicze fortified castle was erected in the 14th-century. In the 17th century, the remnants of the castle were integrated in a Dominican abbey. Subsequently, fragments of the abbey walls became the priests house.

References

External links 
 Mlyniv Raion, Rivne Oblast (Млинівський район, Ровенська область). The History of Cities and Villages of the Ukrainian SSR
 
 
 dr Mieczysław Orłowicz, Ilustrowany przewodnik po Wołyniu, okolice Łucka, Żydyczyn, Torczyn, Targowica - An illustrated guide to Volhynia: the neighbourhoods of Lutsk, Żydyczyn, Torczyn and Targowica